Bill or Billy Green may refer to:

Politics and law
Bill Green Jr. (1910–1963), American politician
Bill Green (New York politician) (Sedgwick William Green, 1929–2002), U.S. Representative from New York
Bill Green III (born 1938), American politician
Bill Green IV (born 1965), American politician in Pennsylvania

Sports

Association football (soccer)
Bill Green (footballer, born 1950) (1950–2017), English professional footballer and manager
Billy Green (footballer, born 1881) (1881–1951), English football goalkeeper
Billy Green (footballer, born 1927) (1927–1996), English football defender

Australian rules football
Bill Green (footballer, born 1914) (1914–1981), Australian rules footballer for Essendon
Bill Green (footballer, born 1932), Australian rules footballer for Richmond
Billy Green (Australian footballer) (1910–1978), Australian rules footballer for St Kilda

Other sports
Bill Green (basketball) (1940–1994), American college basketball player
Bill Green (hammer thrower) (born 1960), American Olympic hammer thrower
Bill Green (sprinter) (1961–2012), American sprinter
Billy Green (athlete) (1904–1981), British Olympic sprinter

Others
Bill Green (entrepreneur), American entrepreneur and author
Bill Green (musician) (1925–1996), American jazz musician
Bill Green (RAF officer) (1917–2014), British pilot during the Battle of Britain
Billy Green (scout) (1794–1877), Canadian soldier
Billy Joe Green, Anishinaabe rock and blues musician from Canada
Bill Green, a character in the Disney Channel TV show Big City Greens
Billy Green, a song by Stan Rogers on the 1999 compilation album: From Coffee House to Concert Hall

See also
William Green (disambiguation)
Will Green (disambiguation)